Nature Ecology and Evolution is an online-only monthly peer-reviewed scientific journal published by Nature Publishing Group covering all aspects of research on ecology and evolutionary biology. It was established in 2017. Its first and current editor-in-chief is Patrick Goymer.

According to the Journal Citation Reports, Nature Ecology and Evolution has a 2020 impact factor of 15.46.

References

External links 
 

Nature Research academic journals
Publications established in 2017
Ecology journals
Monthly journals
English-language journals